Prospekt is the ninth album by the Finnish experimental rock band Circle, first released on CD in 2000 by Ektro Records. It was re-released as a double LP by Static Resonance in 2002. The D-side of the re-issue contains the live track "Työläisten laulu" from a show at Jyväskylä, Finland, on September 11, 2001. It was re-issued again as a CD in 2011 by the Brazilian label Essence Records, including the extra track, and presented in a gatefold sleeve replicating the vinyl version in miniature.

Overall, the album has a tight krautrock sound that shows heavy influence from both Can and Neu!. Drawing largely on long improvisations centered on a single riff or chord progression, the songs have an expansive progressive rock sound as well, often going past ten minutes, like "Aarre" and "Eripwre".

Track listing
 "Dedofiktion" (8:22)
 "Gericht" (6:45)
 "Stimulance" (6:53)
 "Varhain" (6:55)
 "Aarre" (10:17)
 "Eripwre" (10:33)
 "Työläisten laulu (Encore Apocalypse Mix)" (17:40)

Personnel
Teemu Elo
Pike Kontkanen
Jyrki Laiho
Jussi Lehtisalo
Tomi Leppänen
Teemu Niemelä
Janne Peltomäki
Mika Rättö
Markku Peltola
Mika Rintala

Circle (band) albums
2000 albums